Scythropiodes tribula is a moth in the family Lecithoceridae. It was described by Chun-Sheng Wu in 1997. It is found in the Chinese provinces of Sichuan and Hubei.

The wingspan is about 17 mm. The forewings are creamy white in the basal half and scattered with yellowish-brown scales beyond half. There are two distinct brown discal spots at the middle and the end, as well as four dark brown spots near the middle along the costa. The subterminal line consists of indistinct brown spots and there is a row of distinct spots along the termen. The hindwings are grey.

References

Moths described in 1997
Scythropiodes
Moths of Asia